Liam Steel (born 18 May 1991) is a New Zealand rugby union player, currently playing for Major League Rugby side New England Free Jacks. His preferred position is centre or wing.

Professional career
Steel signed for Major League Rugby side New England Free Jacks ahead of the 2020 Major League Rugby season, and re-signed for the 2021 Major League Rugby season.

References

External links
itsrugby.co.uk Profile

1991 births
Living people
New Zealand rugby union players
Rugby union centres
Rugby union wings